Geumganggul Cave is a cave located in Seoraksan National Park in Sokcho, South Korea. The cave is in the rocks of the mountain and is around 600 meters above sea level. It was once a place of worship and  contains a Buddha stone.  At the end of the route, hikers need to use stairs and bridges.  It takes approximately two hours to travel from Sinheugsa Temple to Geumganggul Cave via Biseondae.

References 

Seoraksan
Caves of South Korea